Eduard Hermann (10 July 1887 – 8 February 1960) was an Estonian race walker. He competed in the 3 km and 10 km events at the 1912 and 1920 Olympics, for Russia in 1912 and for Estonia in 1920, but failed to reach the finals.

Hermann took up athletics in 1911. In 1926 he immigrated to Australia, where he worked as a farmer and died in 1960.

References

1887 births
1960 deaths
Athletes (track and field) at the 1912 Summer Olympics
Athletes (track and field) at the 1920 Summer Olympics
Olympic athletes of Estonia
Olympic competitors for the Russian Empire
Estonian male racewalkers
Estonian male boxers
Estonian emigrants to Australia
Male racewalkers from the Russian Empire